Maybrick is a surname. Notable people with the surname include: 

Florence Maybrick (1862–1941), American murderer
James Maybrick (1838–1889), English cotton merchant
Michael Maybrick (1841–1913), English composer and singer